Sapelo Island  is a state-protected barrier island located in McIntosh County, Georgia.  The island is accessible only by boat; the primary ferry comes from the Sapelo Island Visitors Center in McIntosh County, Georgia, a seven-mile (11 km), twenty-minute trip. It is the site of Hog Hammock, the last known Gullah community. It is illegal to visit the island without a permit issued by state tourism authorities.

Approximately 97 percent of the island is owned by the state of Georgia and is managed by the Georgia Department of Natural Resources; the remainder is under private ownership. The western perimeter of Sapelo is the Sapelo Island National Estuarine Research Reserve (SINERR) which is part of NOAA's National Estuarine Research Reserve system (NERR). The Reynolds Mansion, a Georgia State Park, also lies on the south end of the island. Visitors to the island must be a part of an organized tour or guests of residents on the island.

Hog Hammock

The community of Hog Hammock, also known as Hogg Hummock, includes homes, a general store, bar, public library, and other small businesses including vacation rentals. There are two active church congregations in Hog Hammock: St. Luke Baptist Church, founded in 1885, and First African Baptist Church, established in 1866. The latter congregation has an older building known as First African Baptist Church at Raccoon Bluff, constructed in 1900 in the former Raccoon Bluff community north of Hog Hammock. It is used for special services and programs.

Many of the full-time inhabitants of the Hog Hammock Community are African Americans known as Gullah-Geechees, specifically Saltwater Geechees, who descended from enslaved West African people brought to the island in the 1700s and 1800s to work on island plantations. The current population of full-time Gullah-Geechee residents in the community is estimated to be 47 (2009). The residents must bring all supplies from the mainland or purchase them in the small store on the island. The children of Hog Hammock take the ferry to the mainland and then take a bus to school, as the island school closed in 1978.

Hog Hammock is also home to the Sapelo Island Cultural and Revitalization Society, Inc. (SICARS), a non-profit organization whose mission is to preserve and revitalize the Hogg Hummock Community. SICARS was founded in 1993 by Hogg Hummock residents and non-resident descendants who wanted to enhance the future of their community by educating all visitors to the island about the history and to increase awareness that Sapelo has existed as an African community for over 200 years. SICARS was incorporated in 1994, has over 600 members, and continues to grow each year. The organization hosts a Cultural Day festival every third Saturday in October.

The entire  of the community was listed on the National Register of Historic Places in 1996 as Hog Hammock Historic District.

In the 1990s, people from the mainland began acquiring parcels of land from the Gullahs to construct vacation homes. In 2012, McIntosh County property tax appraisers notified Hog Hammock residents of huge property tax increases, even though there was no longer a school on the island. One Hog Hammock property owner's annual tax bill soared from $600 to $2,100. In 2013, a fight over the sudden tax hikes was well underway, with some residents claiming they would be driven from land they had owned for many generations for the benefit of mainlanders who would acquire more of Hog Hammock's homes.

History

Sapelo Island is speculated to be the site of San Miguel de Gualdape, the short-lived (1526–1527) first European settlement in the present-day United States and, if true, it would also be the first place in the present-day U.S. that a Catholic mass was celebrated.

"Sapelo", a name of Indian origin, was known to the Spanish as "Zapala". During the 17th century the island was part of the Guale missionary province of Spanish Florida. After 1680, several missions were merged and relocated to the island under the mission Santa Catalina de Guale.

In the early 19th century Thomas Spalding, a future Georgia Senator and U.S. Representative, bought the island and developed it into a plantation, selling live oak for shipbuilding, introducing irrigation ditches, and cultivating Sea Island Cotton, corn, and sugar cane.  Spalding brought 400 slaves to the island from West Africa and the West Indies to work the plantation and build what would become the Spalding Mansion.

One of the slaves owned by Thomas Spalding was Bilali Muhammad, an Islamic scholar from West Africa who authored a 13-page document about Islamic law on the island — possibly the first manuscript of Islamic law written in the United States.

In 1820, a Winslow Lewis brick lighthouse was built on the island. Although it remained dark for over 90 years, it was restored and relit in 1998.

Spalding opposed the abolition of slavery and he died in 1851 returning from a convention to assert Georgia's position on the matter.  When freed, the former slaves established several settlements on the island; the last remaining is Hog Hammock, with approximately 70 remaining land owners.  During the Civil War, the Spalding home was heavily vandalized and lay in ruins.

By the early 20th Century the International Road Races were attracting notables from the motor world to Savannah, Georgia. One attendee was Howard E. Coffin, founder of the Hudson Motor Car Company. Coffin purchased the entire island, save for the land owned by the former slaves, for $150,000 in 1912. Like Spalding, the Coffins embarked on numerous projects.  Miles of shell-covered roads were laid, creeks were bridged, old fields were cultivated and large tracts were set aside for cattle grazing. The Coffins also renovated and enlarged the Spalding house, creating an island paradise unsurpassed on the coast.  Former presidents Calvin Coolidge and Herbert Hoover as well as aviator Charles Lindbergh were guests in the home.

Tobacco heir Richard Joshua Reynolds Jr., of R. J. Reynolds Tobacco Company bought Sapelo from Coffin in 1934 during the Great Depression, and continued the tradition of agricultural experimentation of the previous owners.  Reynolds and his family used his private island paradise as a part-time residence for three decades, consolidating the island's African-American residents into Hog Hammock. Many worked as servants in South End House, later renamed the Reynolds Mansion by the State of Georgia.

Ecology research 
In 1923 Sapelo owner Howard Coffin introduced imported chachalacas from Mexico to diversify the game bird population for his hunting pals. These chicken-like birds have established a stable, non-native population of 30-40 individuals that at times has spread to neighboring islands.

Sapelo owner R. J. Reynolds, Jr. founded the Sapelo Island Research Foundation in 1949. He later funded the research of Eugene Odum, whose 1958 paper The Ecology of a Salt Marsh won wide acclaim in scientific circles. Odum's paper helped show the fragility of the cycle of nature in the wetlands.

Reynolds' Sapelo Research Foundation also helped fund the University of Georgia's research on the island.  Reynolds' widow, Annemarie Reynolds, sold Sapelo to the state of Georgia for $1 million, a fraction of its worth, in two separate transactions in 1969 and 1976.  The latter sale resulted in the creation of the Sapelo Island National Estuarine Research Reserve, a state-federal partnership between the Georgia Department of Natural Resources and the National Oceanic and Atmospheric Administration. Thanks in part to the philanthropy of the Reynolds family, Sapelo is now open to the public by appointment.

Geologic history 
Sapelo Island is located within the Georgia Bight, a tidally-influenced coastline that experiences two tidal cycles each day. Average difference between low and high tides at Sapelo Island is ~. Consequently, Sapelo island is an example of a tidally-influenced barrier island system. Over the last 2.5 million years (Neogene and Quaternary Periods), sea-level fall occurred in response to growth of the Northern Hemisphere ice cap. The resulting regression generated shoreline complexes that preceded the modern Holocene shoreline, with the most recent known as the late Pleistocene Silver Bluff Formation. The Silver Bluff deposits underlie Holocene Sapelo Island sediments, and are visible along the southwestern bank of Blackbeard Creek as the Raccoon Bluff. During the subsequent transgression, a Holocene shoreline formed the present Sapelo Island shoreline complex, including Cabretta and Nannygoat beaches.

Hurricane Irma
In 2017, storm surge from Hurricane Irma caused a new tidal inlet to breach the southern end of Blackbeard Island, and created a small island between Sapelo Island and Blackbeard Island.

Climate

Tourism
The Georgia Department of Natural Resources (DNR) offers tours several days a week.  These can be booked through the Sapelo Island Visitors Center.  Additionally, many island residents offer private tours, which can often be customized to fit the interests of individual tourists. A state campground is also available to groups of 15 to 25 people on Cabretta Island, adjacent to Sapelo Island.

In popular culture
Sapelo Island resident and descendant of Bilali Muhammed, Cornelia Walker Bailey, wrote the book God, Dr. Buzzard and the Bolito Man: A Saltwater Geechee Talk About Life on Sapelo Island, Georgia which is a first-person account of growing up on Sapelo; co-author Christena Bledsoe.

R. J. Reynolds' grandson Patrick Reynolds and author Tom Shachtman co-authored The Gilded Leaf: Triumph, Tragedy and Tobacco - Three Generations of the R. J. Reynolds Fortune and Family, which offers an unvarnished view of R. J. Reynolds, Jr. during the time he owned Sapelo.

Author Tom Poland wrote a novel titled Forbidden Island ... An Island Called Sapelo.

Singer Larry Jon Wilson has recorded a song titled "Sapelo", which is about the island on the album Testifying - The Country Soul Revue.

Author and island resident Michele Nicole Johnson published the photograph book, Sapelo Island's Hog Hammock, in 2009.

Author T. C. Boyle set his 1990 novel East is East on a fictional island in Georgia, much of which resembles Sapelo Island, such as the presence of Hog Hammock and proximity to Darien.

An episode of Season 6 of the Discovery Channel show Dirty Jobs featured the termite research program at the University of Georgia Marine Institute on Sapelo Island.

An episode of ESPN's Outside the Lines was filmed on Sapelo Island and the Hog Hammock community in 2013, documenting the childhood of Allen Bailey and telling the community's story and current property tax issues.

The Podcast Uncivil published on 10/11/17 was mostly based on the experience of local Gullah people struggling to keep their land and culture intact, despite many legal struggles. "A 19th century promise, and a 21st century betrayal. The past and present of 40 acres and a mule."

See also 
 Sapelo Island Range Front Light
 Sapelo Island Light
Sapelo red peas
 Behavior Cemetery
 First African Baptist Church at Raccoon Bluff

References

External links

 Sapelo Island Reserve and Reynolds Mansion, Georgia State Parks
 "The First Muslim American Scholar Bilali Muhammad", Lost Islamic History
 Sapelo Island Culture and Revitalization Society
 About Sapelo
 Patrick Reynolds and Tom Shachtman, The Gilded Leaf: Three Generations of the RJ Reynolds Family and Fortune, posted by Tobacco Free 
 "I Am Sapelo", Georgia Coast 
 University of Georgia Marine Institute at Sapelo Island
 Friends of the Marine Institute
 

Catholic Church in Georgia (U.S. state)
Barrier islands of Georgia (U.S. state)
Gullah country
Protected areas established in 1965
Protected areas of McIntosh County, Georgia
State parks of Georgia (U.S. state)
Georgia (U.S. state) Sea Islands
Islands of McIntosh County, Georgia
Islands of Georgia (U.S. state)
1965 establishments in Georgia (U.S. state)